Fire departments in the U.S. state of Maryland function in the principal cities, towns and communities in each county.

Allegany County

The borough of Wellersburg is in Somerset County, Pennsylvania where it provides coverage as Station 630, but does provide primary fire protection to portions of Allegany County as Station 30.
The CDP of Bloomington is in Garrett County, Maryland where it provides coverage as Station 100, but does provide primary fire protection to portions of Allegany County as Station 36.
The community of New Creek is in Mineral County, West Virginia, but does provide primary fire protection to portions of Allegany County, serving both counties as Station 38.

Anne Arundel County
All volunteer stations in Anne Arundel County have at least 2 career firefighter on staff 24x7, with the exception of Ferndale and Odenton.

Baltimore County

Stations 1-19, 54-58, and 60 are fully staffed by career members of the Baltimore County Fire Department. Stations 20-51, 53, 74, 85, and 156 are independent companies staffed solely by volunteers.  Station 175 is staffed by the Maryland Air National Guard.

A^ Central Alarmers (Rehab 155) was absorbed by the White Marsh Volunteer Fire Company in 2015.
B^ Violetville Volunteer Fire Company (Station 34) was absorbed by Lansdowne Volunteer Fire Department (Station 36) on February 1, 2017.
C^ Middleborough Volunteer Fire Company (Station 23), Rockaway Beach Volunteer Fire Company (Station 24), and Hyde Park Volunteer Fire Company (Station 25) merged on November 21, 2017 forming the Essex Volunteer Fire Company (Station 51).
D^ Sparrows Point Fire Department (Station 51) was a fire station operated at the former site of the Bethlehem Steel mill. Station 51 was disbanded with the closing of the mill and the fire station became a part of Baltimore County Fire Department as Station 57. The Baltimore County Fire-Rescue Academy is adjacent to the station.
E^ Middle River Volunteer Fire Company (Station 22) and Middle River Volunteer Ambulance Rescue Company (Station 52) merged on August 31, 2016, forming the Middle River Volunteer Fire & Rescue Company (Station 74).
F^ Boring Volunteer Fire Company (Station 42) and Arcadia Volunteer Fire Company (Station 43) merged on September 1, 2017, forming the Upperco Volunteer Fire Company (Station 85).

Baltimore City

Baltimore City Fire Department

Calvert County

Caroline County

The town of Marydel is in Caroline County, Maryland but the fire company is physically located across the state line in Kent County, Delaware, where it also provides coverage, causing the discrepancy in the numbering system.
A portion of the county is covered by Queen Anne-Hillsboro Volunteer Fire Co. from Queen Anne's County. The town of Hillsboro is in Caroline County, while the town of Queen Anne lies in both Queen Anne's and Talbot Counties.

Carroll County

Cecil County

Charles County

Dorchester County

Frederick County

Garrett County

Harford County

Howard County

12 Waterloo
7645 Port Capital Dr. Jessup MD
Engine 121, P125, B128, BC 1

13
{Glenwood in Woodbine Maryland
1 Engine 1 ALS transport Tanker Brush Truck

14
Merriweather in Columbia Maryland 
6025 Symphony Woods Rd, Columbia, MD 21044

Kent County

Montgomery County

See Montgomery County Fire and Rescue Service.

Prince George's County
Prince George's County Fire/EMS Department

Queen Anne's County

St. Mary's County Fire and EMS

Somerset County

Talbot County

 Queen Anne-Hillsboro Volunteer Fire Co. from Talbot County. The town of Hillsboro is in Caroline County, while the town of Queen Anne lies in both Queen Anne's and Talbot Counties.

Washington County

Wicomico County

The town of Delmar, Maryland is in Wicomico County, Maryland but the fire company is physically located across the state line in Delmar, Delaware, in Sussex County, Delaware, where it also provides coverage.

Worcester County

Defunct

See also
Engine House No. 8 (Baltimore, Maryland)
Great Baltimore Fire
Howard County Fire and Rescue (Maryland)
Maryland State Fire Marshal
Montgomery County Fire and Rescue Service
Poppleton Fire Station

References

 
 
Maryland